Jérémie Porsan-Clémenté (born 16 December 1997) is a French footballer who plays as a forward for the B-team of AS Saint-Étienne.

Club career
Born in Schœlcher, Martinique, Porsan-Clémenté is a youth exponent from Marseille. He made his league debut in a 0–2 home loss against Montpellier on 17 August 2014, replacing Florian Thauvin for the final 15 minutes. At the time, he was the youngest player to play a competitive match for Marseille (16 years and 8 months), but his teammate Bilal Boutobba again broke the record in December of that year.

In June 2017, he joined fellow Ligue 1 side Montpellier. Mainly a reserve in his first season, he made his debut for the club on 19 May 2018 in the last game of the season, playing 90 minutes of a 1–1 draw at Rennes.

Career statistics

Club

References

External links
 
 

1997 births
Living people
People from Schœlcher
French footballers
Martiniquais footballers
Association football forwards
France youth international footballers
French people of Martiniquais descent
Ligue 1 players
Championnat National 2 players
Championnat National 3 players
Olympique de Marseille players
Montpellier HSC players